Majid Ali is a Pakistani cricketer. He made his first-class debut for Multan Tigers in the 2014–15 Quaid-e-Azam Trophy on 12 October 2014. He made his Twenty20 debut for the Multan Tigers in the 2015 Haier Super 8 Twenty20 Cup on 12 May 2015.

References

External links
 

Living people
Pakistani cricketers
1994 births